Notarcha obrinusalis is a moth in the family Crambidae. It was described by Francis Walker in 1859. It is found in Democratic Republic of the Congo (North Kivu, Katanga), Zambia, China, India and Indonesia (Borneo, Moluccas).

The larvae have been recorded feeding on Zea mays, as well as Gramineae, Leguminosae and Polygonaceae species.

References

Moths described in 1859
Spilomelinae